The French Grand Prix is a Formula One motor race.

French Grand Prix may also refer to:

French Grand Prix contains links to articles for the annual race in each year
French motorcycle Grand Prix

See also

 
Grand Prix of France (disambiguation)
Grand Prix (disambiguation)